Rear Admiral Sai Venkat Raman, VSM is a serving Flag officer in the Indian Navy. He currently serves as the Flag Officer Commanding Tamil Nadu and Puducherry Naval Area. He earlier served as the Commandant of the Naval War College, Goa.

Naval career
Raman was commissioned into the Indian Navy on 1 January 1990, after attending the National Defence Academy. He is a specialist in Communications and Electronic Warfare. He spent his early years onboard frontline warships as the communications officer. He attended the Defence Services Staff College, Wellington.

Raman commanded the Talwar-class stealth guided missile frigate . He attended the Higher Defence Management Course at the College of Defence Management, Secunderabad. He served as the executive officer and the principal warfare officer of the lead ship of the aircraft carrier .

Raman served as the Fleet Communications Officer of the Western Fleet.  As a Commodore, he served as the head of the directorate of Naval Intelligence. For his tenure as Principal Director Naval Intelligence, he was awarded the Vishisht Seva Medal on 26 January 2019.

Flag rank
Raman was promoted to flag rank in February 2021 and was appointed Commandant of the Naval War College, Goa (NWC). He took over as the 5th Commandant of the college, from Rear Admiral Sanjay Jasjit Singh. After a tenure of over a year as the Commandant of NWC, he was appointed Flag Officer Commanding Tamil Nadu & Puducherry Naval Area (FOTNA). He took over from Rear Admiral Puneet Chadha on 20 May 2022 at Chennai.

Awards and decorations

See also
 Naval War College, Goa

References 

Indian Navy admirals
Living people
Year of birth missing (living people)
National Defence Academy (India) alumni
Defence Services Staff College alumni
College of Defence Management alumni
Commandants of Naval War College, Goa
Recipients of the Vishisht Seva Medal